Mount Muanenguba (also spelled Manenguba or Mwanenguba) is a volcano in the Southwest Province of Cameroon. The Manenguba shrew and endemic vegetal species are native to the mountain. The area is featured in the documentary The Mists of Mwanenguba with botanist Martin Cheek.

Gallery

References

External links
The Mists of Mwanenguba

Volcanoes of Cameroon
Southwest Region (Cameroon)
Pleistocene shield volcanoes
Cameroonian Highlands forests